Arson is the crime of willfully and deliberately setting fire to or charring property. Although the act of arson typically involves buildings, the term can also refer to the intentional burning of other things, such as motor vehicles, watercraft, or forests. The crime is typically classified as a felony, with instances involving a greater degree of risk to human life or property carrying a stricter penalty. Arson which results in death can be further prosecuted as manslaughter or murder. A common motive for arson is to commit insurance fraud. In such cases, a person destroys their own property by burning it and then lies about the cause in order to collect against their insurance policy.

A person who commits arson is referred to as an arsonist, or a serial arsonist if arson has been committed several times. Arsonists normally use an accelerant (such as gasoline or kerosene) to ignite, propel and directionalize fires, and the detection and identification of ignitable liquid residues (ILRs) is an important part of fire investigations. Pyromania is an impulse control disorder characterized by the pathological setting of fires. Most acts of arson are not committed by pyromaniacs.

Etymology
The term derives from Law French arsoun (late 13th century), from Old French , from Late Latin  "a burning," (acc.) from the verb ardēre, "to burn."

The Old English term was bærnet, lit. "burning"; and Edward Coke has indictment of burning (1640). Arsonist is from 1864.

English common law
Historically, the common law crime of arson had four elements:
The malicious
burning
of the dwelling
of another

Malicious For purposes of common law arson, "malicious" refers to action creating a great risk of a burning. 
Burning At common law charring to any part of dwelling was sufficient to satisfy this element. No significant amount of damage to the dwelling was required. Any injury or damage to the structure caused by exposure to heat or flame is sufficient.
Of the dwelling 'Dwelling' refers to a place of residence. The destruction of an unoccupied building was not considered arson: "... since arson protected habitation, the burning of an unoccupied house did not constitute arson."  At common law a structure did not become a residence until the first occupants had moved in, and ceased to be a dwelling if the occupants abandoned the premises with no intention of resuming their residency. Dwelling includes structures and outbuildings within the curtilage. Dwellings were not limited to houses. A barn could be the subject of arson if occupied as a dwelling.
Of another Burning one's own dwelling does not constitute common law arson, even if the purpose was to collect insurance, because "it was generally assumed in early England that one had the legal right to destroy his own property in any manner he chose".  Moreover, for purposes of common law arson, possession or occupancy rather than title determines whose dwelling the structure is. Thus a tenant who sets fire to his rented house would not be guilty of common law arson, while the landlord who set fire to a rented dwelling house would be guilty.

Degrees
Many U.S. state legal systems and the legal systems of several other countries divide arson into degrees, depending sometimes on the value of the property but more commonly on its use and whether the crime was committed in the day or night.
First-degree arson – Burning an occupied structure such as a school or a place where people are normally present
Second-degree arson – Burning  an unoccupied building such as an empty barn or an unoccupied house or other structure in order to claim insurance on such property
Third-degree arson – Burning  an abandoned building or an abandoned area, such as a field, forest or woods.

Many statutes vary the degree of the crime according to the criminal intent of the accused. Some US states use other degrees of arson, such as "fourth" and "fifth" degree, while some states do not categorize arson by any degree. For example, in the state of Tennessee, arson is categorized as "arson" and "aggravated arson".

United States

In the United States, the common law elements of arson are often varied in different jurisdictions. For example, the element of "dwelling" is no longer required in most states, and arson occurs by the burning of any real property without consent or with unlawful intent. Arson is prosecuted with attention to degree of severity in the alleged offense. First degree arson generally occurs when people are harmed or killed in the course of the fire, while second degree arson occurs when significant destruction of property occurs. While usually a felony, arson may also be prosecuted as a misdemeanor, "criminal mischief", or "destruction of property."

Burglary also occurs, if the arson involved a "breaking and entering".  A person may be sentenced to death if arson occurred as a method of homicide, as was the case in California of Raymond Lee Oyler and in Texas of Cameron Todd Willingham.

In New York, arson is charged in five degrees. Arson in the first degree is a Class A-1 felony and requires the intent to burn the building with a person inside using an explosive incendiary device. In New York, the criminal charge of arson includes a maximum sentence of 25 years to life.

In California, a conviction for arson of property that is not one's own is a felony punishable by up to three years in state prison. Aggravated arson, which carries the most severe punishment for arson, is punishable by 10 years to life in state prison. Raymond Lee Oyler was ultimately convicted of murder and sentenced to death for a 2006 fire in southern California that led to the deaths of five U.S. Forest Service firefighters; he was the first U.S. citizen to receive such a conviction and penalty for wildfire arson.

Some states, such as California, prosecute the lesser offense of "reckless burning" when the fire is set recklessly as opposed to wilfully and maliciously. The study of the causes is the subject of fire investigation.

England, Wales, and Hong Kong

In British law, arson was a common law offence (except for the offence of arson in royal dockyards) dealing with the criminal destruction of buildings by fire. The common law offence was abolished by s.11(1) of the Criminal Damage Act 1971. The 1971 Act makes no distinction as to mode of destruction except that s.1(3) requires that if the destruction is by fire, the offence is charged as arson; s.4 of the Act provides a maximum penalty of life imprisonment for conviction under s.1 whether or not the offence is charged as arson. In Hong Kong, the common law offence was abolished by s 67 of the Crimes Ordinance 1971 (Part VIII of which, as amended by Crimes (Amendment) Ordinance 1972, mirrored the English Criminal Damage Act 1971). Like the English counterparts, 63 of the 1972 Ordinance provides a maximum penalty of life imprisonment, and s 60(3) of the Ordinance requires that if the damage is by fire the offence should be charged as arson.

Myanmar 
In the Burmese legal system, arson is considered "mischief by fire" under sections 435 and 436 of the Myanmar Penal Code and punishable by fine and imprisonment. The statutes were last amended on 1 July 2016, and made arson on houses and buildings punishable with up to 20 years in prison.

The Burmese military has long used arson as a weapon of war against civilians. From the 2021 Myanmar coup d'état to August 2022, military forces committed arson on 28,434 houses in the country.

Scotland

While the Scottish legal system has no offence known as arson statutorily defined, there are many offences that are used to charge those with acts that would normally constitute arson in other nations. Events constituting arson in British law might be dealt with as one or more of a variety of offences such as wilful fire-raising, culpable and reckless conduct, vandalism or other offences depending on the circumstances of the event. The more serious offences (in particular wilful fire-raising and culpable and reckless conduct) can incur a sentence of life imprisonment.

Notable arsonists
 Julio González, the perpetrator behind the Happy Land Fire killed 87 in 1990, likely as revenge against his ex-girlfriend
 John Leonard Orr, the cause of roughly 2,000 Los Angeles fires, who himself was arson investigator
 Raymond Lee Oyler, the cause of 24 fires and $9,000,000 in damages.

See also

 Arson in royal dockyards
 Fire investigation
 Firefighter arson
 Herostratus
 Incendiary weapons
 Insurance fraud
 John Leonard Orr
 John Magno
 Margaret Clark
 Pyromania
 Reckless burning
 Molotov cocktail
 Kirk's Fire Investigation

References

Further reading
 
 White, J. & Dalby, J. T., 2000. "Arson". In D. Mercer, T. Mason, M. McKeown, G. McCann (Eds.) Forensic Mental Health Care.  Edinburgh: Churchill Livingston.

External links

 How to combat arson
 An actual Arson Investigation Report

 
Fire
Property crimes
Organized crime activity
Terrorism tactics